WDLM may refer to:

 WDLM (AM), a radio station (960 AM) licensed to East Moline, Illinois, United States
 WDLM-FM, a radio station (89.3 FM) licensed to East Moline, Illinois, United States